FX was an Asian pay-television entertainment channel, owned and operated by Fox Networks Group Asia Pacific, a subsidiary of Disney International Operations. It was launched on 2004 along with Playhouse Disney.

In India, the channel was replaced by an Indian localised feed in September 2012; however, some TV providers continue to distribute the Asian feed.

In South Korea, Tcast, the licensor for the Fox channels in the country, announced on December 31, 2020 that it had terminated its license agreement with The Walt Disney Company Korea renaming its channels. FX in that region would become .

Officially cease broadcasting and transmission on  last day and night of August 2021 at 11:59:59pm, FX along with most of The Walt Disney Company channels (Fox Crime, Fox, Fox Life, Disney Junior, Disney Channel, Nat Geo People, Fox Movies, Fox Action Movies, Fox Family Movies, Star Movies China, SCM Legend, and five of its sports channels) cease transmission on Now TV Hong Kong.

After 17 years of broadcasting, FX along with most of The Walt Disney Company channels across Southeast Asia and Hong Kong (Fox Crime, Fox, Fox Life, Disney Junior, Disney Channel, Nat Geo People, Fox Movies, Fox Action Movies, Fox Family Movies, Star Movies China, SCM Legend, and five of its sports channels) officially ceased broadcasting and transmission on 1 October 2021 at 12:59:59am. Most of these channel's shows moved to Disney+ (in Singapore, Philippines, Hong Kong and Taiwan) and Disney+ Hotstar (in Southeast Asia outside Singapore and Philippines).

Feeds
Southeast Asia (except Brunei, Indonesia, South Korea and Japan)
Philippines
High definition feed

See also
 FX
 Fox Networks Group
 STAR TV

References

External links
 Official Site
 Official Site  

Television stations in Hong Kong
Defunct television channels
Television channels and stations established in 2004
Television channels and stations disestablished in 2021
Mass media in Southeast Asia
Asia
Cable television in Hong Kong